A Tag team is a professional wrestling match between teams of two or more wrestlers. It may also refer to:
Tag Team (group), an American hip hop group
"Tag-Team" (Land of the Lost episode), an episode of the 1974 series Land of the Lost
The developers of the video game Tag: The Power of Paint